Spoor is a 1994 compilation album by Thin White Rope.  It brings together the Red Sun EP, various singles, and demo versions of songs.

Track listing
All tracks by Guy Kyser except where noted.

"Town Without Pity" – (Tiomkin/Washington)  (Also on "Red Sun") 
"Red Sun (Original Version)" (Also on "Red Sun") 
"The Man With The Golden Gun" – (Barry)  (Also on "Red Sun") 
"They're Hanging Me Tonight" – (Low/Wolpert)  (Also on "Red Sun") 
"Some Velvet Morning" – (Hazlewood) (Also on "Red Sun")
"Ants Are Cavemen" –  (From Sub Pop 7") 
"Little Doll (Live)" –  (Alexander/Asheton/Asheton/Osterberg)  (From Sub Pop 7") 
"Outlaw Blues" –  (Dylan)  
"Burn The Flames" –  (Erickson) (From "Where The Pyramid Meets The Eye" compilation) 
"Eye" – (The Poster Children) (Single) 
"Skinhead (Live)" (Single) 
"Tina And Glen (Demo)"  
"Munich Eunich (Demo)"    
"God Rest Ye Merry Gentlemen (Live)" –  (Traditional)  
"Here She Comes Now (Demo)" –  (Morrison/Cale/Tucker/Reed)

References

Thin White Rope albums
1994 compilation albums
Frontier Records albums